James Cawley (born June 23, 1967) is an American executive film producer and actor, known for his assumption of the role of Captain James T. Kirk in the fan film series Star Trek: Phase II.

Star Trek: Phase II
A big Star Trek fan growing up, in 1997 Cawley began collecting props and costumes from the original series and acquired the original Enterprise blueprints when he interned on Star Trek: The Next Generation. He spent over $100,000 constructing near-flawless recreations of sets in an abandoned car dealership in Port Henry, New York. Funding the project through his career as an Elvis impersonator, Cawley and fellow Star Trek fans gathered together to begin shooting new episodes and by 2003 a pilot “Come What May” was shot as a proof of concept.

Cawley left the role of Kirk following the episode "Kitumba" to focus solely on the production aspect of the series. However, he makes a humorous cameo in the following episode "Mind-Sifter" as an Elvis impersonator in an asylum who confronts Kirk (now played by Brian Gross), referred to as having "been here forever," with the new Kirk declaring, "I hate that guy!"

Other projects
Cawley’s prominent role in Star Trek: New Voyages gave him the opportunity to play small roles in a few other Star Trek fan episodes. He portrayed Mackenzie Calhoun in the 41st Star Trek: Hidden Frontier episode Vigil, and had a cameo as Captain Kirk along with ‘’New Voyages’’ co-stars Jeff Quinn and John Kelley in the premiere episode of Starship Farragut titled The Captaincy.

The starship Ticonderoga in the Star Trek: Enterprise episode "The Aenar" was named as a nod to Cawley's hometown. His sets, props and costumes have also been used by Star Trek: Enterprise in the episode "In a Mirror, Darkly" and in the fan film Of Gods and Men in which Cawley also plays one of Captain Kirk's nephews. In addition to producing more episodes of Phase II, Cawley appeared in the cameo role of a bridge officer in the new Star Trek movie.

In 2009, Cawley and his production company, Retro Film Studios, secured the license to Buck Rogers, which began filming in late 2009, with plans to offer episodes online in 2010. However, as of 2022, no episodes have been produced or released. Cawley is also developing a continuation of the cult spy/western series The Wild Wild West.

References

External links

James Cawley on CBS's The Early Show
James Cawley on Attack of the Show
Star Trek: Phase II Official website

1967 births
Male actors from New York (state)
American male television actors
American television producers
Living people
21st-century American male actors